Aqa Shafi may refer to:
 Aqa Shafi, Kohgiluyeh and Boyer-Ahmad
 Aqa Shafi, Mazandaran